Douglas Muir (5 November 1904, in Greenwich, London – 30 November 1966, in Chelsea, London) was a British film and television actor.
known for The Appleyards (1952), Scrooge (1951) and his recurring role as Steed's boss in the Dr. David Keel/Cathy Gale era of TV's The Avengers. He was married to the actress Miriam Adams. Muir died on 30 November 1966 in Brompton Hospital, Chelsea, London.

Filmography

References

External links

1904 births
1966 deaths
Male actors from London
British male film actors
British male television actors
20th-century British male actors